Giovan Battista Pirovano (5 May 1937 – 8 November 2014) was an Italian footballer who played at both professional and international levels as a midfielder.

Career
Born in Vercelli, Pirovano played for Pro Vercelli, Verona, Fiorentina and Legnano.

With Fiorentina he won the 1966 Italian Cup and the 1969 league championship.

He made one international appearance for Italy, in 1966.

Later life and death
He died on 8 November 2014, aged 77.

References

1937 births
2014 deaths
People from Vercelli
Italian footballers
Italy international footballers
F.C. Pro Vercelli 1892 players
Hellas Verona F.C. players
ACF Fiorentina players
A.C. Legnano players
Serie A players
Serie B players
Association football midfielders